Amin Lakhani (born 1 October 1959) is a former cricketer who played first-class and List A cricket in Pakistan from 1976 to 1993.

A left-arm spin bowler, Lakhani took a hat-trick in each innings of a match in October 1978: aged 19, playing for a Universities and Young Pakistan team against the touring Indian Test team, he took 6 for 58 with a hat-trick in the first innings and 6 for 80 with a hat-trick in the second. All six of his hat-trick victims were Test players. Despite his success, the Indian team won by two wickets.

He captained the Pakistan National Shipping Corporation cricket team from 1986–87 until 1992–93, his final season of first-class cricket, when he also took his best bowling figures of 8 for 60 against Pakistan Automobiles Corporation.

References

External links

1959 births
Living people
Cricketers from Karachi
Pakistani cricketers
Karachi cricketers
United Bank Limited cricketers
Allied Bank Limited cricketers
Pakistan National Shipping Corporation cricketers
Pakistan Universities cricketers